Iya Alexeyevna Arepina (July 2, 1930 in Ardatov – July 24, 2003 in Moscow) was a Soviet/Russian actress.

She was named Best Actress at the 1955 Cannes Film Festival for her performance in Bolshaya Semya, directed by Iosif Kheifits.

Selected filmography
 Steppe Dawns (1953) as Varya
 A Big Family (1954) as Tonya Zhurbina
 Land and People (1955) as student
 Ilya Muromets (1956) as Alyonushka
 The Wrestler and the Clown (1957) as Maria Nikolayevna aka Mimi
 Most Expensive (1957) as Polina, sister of Roman
 The Captain's Daughter (1958) as Masha Mironova
 Red Leaves (1958) as Stasya Yanovskaya
 On the Roads of War (1958) as Vera
 Under the Sound of Wheels (1958) as Nastya
 Journey Beyond Three Seas (1958) as Dunayaha
 Special Approach (1959) as Olya, kindergarten manageress
 Gloomy Vangur (1959) as Natasha, student
 After the Ball (1961) as Varenka Butyrlina
 When Bridges are Made (1962) as Inga
 War and Peace (1967) as girl in the Akhrosimova house, who gave Natasha a letter
 The Incident, which no one Noticed (1967)
 The Red Snowball Tree (1974) as Egor Prokudin's sister

References

External links

1930 births
2003 deaths
Russian film actresses
Soviet film actresses
Cannes Film Festival Award for Best Actress winners
People from Mordovia